Portugal has 18 districts and 2 autonomous regions (Azores and Madeira). Population figures are from the 2021 census.

By population

By area

By population density

References 

Portugal
Portugal geography-related lists